Inus Michael Kritzinger (born 13 May 1989) is a South African rugby union player, currently playing with the . His regular position is scrum-half.

Career

Youth
He returned to the Free State Under-21s for 2010.

Varsity Shield
In 2011 and 2012, he was voted the "Back That Rocks" and he was joint top try scorer in 2012 with 6 tries. In 2013, he was voted the "Player That Rocks" and he was the sole top try scorer with 8 tries.

Griffons

He also played for the Griffons in the 2013 Vodacom Cup and 2013 Currie Cup First Division competitions and then signed a senior contract for 2014.

Representative Rugby
In 2013, he was initially included in a South Africa President's XV squad to play in the 2013 IRB Tbilisi Cup, but was omitted from the final squad.

References

1989 births
Living people
Free State Cheetahs players
Griffons (rugby union) players
Rugby union players from Welkom
South African rugby union players
Rugby union scrum-halves